The Communist Workers' International (KAI) or Fourth Communist International was a council communist international.  It was founded around the Manifesto of the Fourth Communist International, published by the Communist Workers' Party of Germany (KAPD) in 1921.

History
The organisation was founded in 1922, following a split in the KAPD, by members of the Essen Faction, including Herman Gorter and Karl Schröder, the Berlin Faction holding that the formation of an international was premature.  It was joined by the Communist Workers' Party of the Netherlands, Sylvia Pankhurst's Communist Workers' Party in Britain, the Left Communists in Russia (who accordingly renamed themselves the Communist Workers' Party), the Communist Workers' Group in Russia and some left communists in Belgium and Bulgaria.

The International was never able to organise joint activities and probably never reached 1,000 members.  It was weakened by the divisions (and in some cases dissolution) of the parties that formed it, and the departure of the Russian Communist Workers' Group, who disagreed with its opposition to a united front with the Third International.

The KAPD's Essen Tendency dissolved in 1927, and the leadership of the International was passed to the Netherlands, as the Dutch group was the only party still holding membership, the other constituents being isolated individuals. It still nominally existed at the start of the 1930s, but undertook no international activity, only publishing work in the name of the organisation, until it was formally dissolved in February 1933.

References

Bibliography

External links
 Richard Gombin, The Radical Tradition: Council Communism
Herman Gorter, The World Revolution
Commentary on Herman Gorter's Open Letter to Comrade Lenin

 
1922 establishments in Germany
1927 disestablishments in Germany
1933 disestablishments in the Netherlands
Organizations established in 1921
Organizations disestablished in 1927
Organizations disestablished in 1933